Sunzhuang (孙庄) may refer to the following locations in China:

 Sunzhuang Township, Jingxing County, Hebei
 Sunzhuang Township, Wuqiang County, Hebei
 Sunzhuang Township, Zhuozhou, Hebei